Roman Vatslavovich Malinovsky (18 March 1876 – 5 November 1918) was a prominent Bolshevik politician before the Russian revolution, while at the same time working as the best paid agent for the Okhrana, the Tsarist secret police. They codenamed him  'Portnoi' (the tailor).

He was a brilliant orator, tall, red-haired, yellow-eyed and pockmarked, "robust, ruddy complexioned, vigorous, excitable, a heavy drinker, a gifted leader of men."

Early life
Malinovsky was born in Plotsk province, Poland, at the time part of the Russian Empire. His parents were ethnic Polish peasants, who died while he was still a child. He was jailed for several robberies from 1894-1899, for which he spent three years in prison and was also charged with attempted rape. In 1902, he enlisted in the prestigious Izmaylovsky Regiment by impersonating a cousin with the same name. Malinovsky began as an Okhrana agent within the regiment, reporting on fellow soldiers and officers. He was discharged from the army at the end of the Russo-Japanese War and relocated to Saint Petersburg.

Politics

In 1906, he found a job as a lathe operator and joined the Petersburg Metalworkers' Union and the Russian Social Democratic Labour Party (RSDLP). Initially, he was inclined to support the Mensheviks, who believed in trade union autonomy, rather than the Bolshevik faction, who sought to control the union. He was arrested five times as a union activist, but his Okhrana handlers arranged each time for him to be released without arousing suspicion. Exiled from St Petersburg in 1910, he moved to Moscow. Here, for the first time, he was awarded a regular salary as a police informer, to supplement his wages as a metal turner, and was instructed by the Okhrana Director S. P. Beletsky to ensure that the different factions of the RSDLP never reunited. Malinovsky therefore joined the Bolsheviks. In January 1912, he travelled to Prague, where Vladimir Lenin had organised a conference to finalise the break with the Mensheviks and create a separate Bolshevik organisation. He made such a good impression on Lenin that he was elected to the Central Committee, and chosen to represent the Bolsheviks in the forthcoming elections to the Fourth Duma, to which he was elected as its most prominent working class deputy, in November 1912. He was simultaneously the Okhrana's best-paid agent, earning 8,000 rubles a year, 1,000 more than the Director of the Imperial Police. He led the six-member Bolshevik group (two of whom were Okhrana agents) and was deputy chairman of the Social Democrats in the Duma. As a secret agent, he helped send several important Bolsheviks (like Sergo Ordzhonikidze, Joseph Stalin, and Yakov Sverdlov) into Siberian exile.

In November 1912, he visited Lenin in Krakow and was urged not to unite with the Mensheviks. Malinovsky ignored that by reading a conciliatory speech in the Duma, to throw any suspicion off of himself. On December 28, 1912, he attended a Central Committee meeting in Vienna. He persuaded Lenin to appoint an Okhrana agent, Miron Chernomazov, as editor of Pravda as opposed to Stalin's candidate Stepan Shahumyan. The tsarist regime was determined to keep the RSDLP split, meaning that conciliators and pro-party groups were targeted for sabotage, while liquidators and recallists were encouraged.

When Menshevik leader Julius Martov first denounced Malinovsky as a spy in January 1913, Lenin refused to believe him and stood by Malinovsky. The accusing article was signed Ts, short for Tsederbaum, Martov's real name. Stalin threatened Martov's sister and brother-in-law, Lydia and Fedor Dan by saying they would regret it if the Mensheviks denounced Malinovsky.

Malinovsky's efforts helped the Okhrana arrest Sergo Ordzhonikidze (April 14, 1912), Yakov Sverdlov (February 10, 1913) and Stalin (February 23, 1913). The latter was arrested at a Bolshevik fundraising ball, which Malinovsky had persuaded him to attend by lending him a suit and silk cravat. Malinovsky was talking to Stalin when detectives took him and even shouting he would free him.

In July 1913, he betrayed a plan for Sverdlov and Stalin to escape, warning the police chief in Turukhansk. He was then the only Bolshevik leader not in foreign or Siberian exile. Soon after this foiled escape plan, Stalin came over to Martov's view and strongly suspected Malinovsky to be an Okhrana spy, which was confirmed correct years later, fuelling Stalin's future distrust of his comrades.

Resignation, exile and death

On May 8, 1914 he was forced to resign from the Duma after Russia's recently promoted Deputy Minister for the Interior, General Vladimir Dzhunkovsky, decided that having a police agent in such a prominent position might cause a scandal. He was given a pay off of 6,000 roubles, and ordered to leave the country. He joined Lenin in Cracow, where a Bolshevik commission looked into rumours that he was a police spy. Despite testimony from Nikolai Bukharin and Elena Troyanovskaya, who both suspected that they had been betrayed to the police by Malinovsky when they were arrested in Moscow, respectively in 1910 and 1912, the commission accepted Malinovsky's story that he had been forced to resign when the police had blackmailed him by threatening to publicise the old charge of attempted rape. When World War I broke out, he was interned in a POW camp by the Germans.  Lenin, still standing by him, sent him clothes. He said: "If he is a provocateur, the police gained less from it than our Party did." This refers to his strong anti-Menshevism. Eventually, Lenin changed his mind: "What a swine: shooting's too good for him!"

In 1918, he tried to join the Petrograd Soviet, but Grigory Zinoviev recognized him.  In November, after a brief trial, Malinovsky was executed by a firing squad.

According to the British historian Simon Sebag Montefiore, his successful infiltration into the Bolsheviks helped fuel the paranoia of the Soviets (and, more specifically, Stalin) that eventually gave way to the Great Terror.

See also 
 Yevno Azef
Operation Trust

Notes

References

Further reading 

1876 births
1918 deaths
Polish emigrants to Russia
People from Warsaw Governorate
Russian Social Democratic Labour Party members
Old Bolsheviks
Members of the 4th State Duma of the Russian Empire
Okhrana informants
Russian military personnel of World War I
Prisoners of war from the Russian Empire
World War I prisoners of war held by Germany
People executed by Russia by firing squad
Executed Russian people